Haplomitrium dentatum is a species of liverwort from India.

External links
 The Plant List entry

Plants described in 1976
Calobryales
Flora of India (region)